The 2019 Birmingham Legion FC season is the club's inaugural season and their first in the USL Championship, the second tier of American soccer. The season covers the period from the founding of the club to the start of the 2020 USL Championship season.

Roster

Non-competitive

Preseason
Although Legion FC officially announced just one preseason game, the matchup against Nashville SC on February 16, the club wound up playing a four-game preseason schedule ahead of its inaugural season. Two of the four games were against fellow USL Championship clubs, with one fixture against a team from Major League Soccer and one against a USL League One opponent. The first two preseason matches saw Birmingham as the road team, with Legion FC hosting the final two games at BBVA Field.

Competitive

USL Championship

Standings

Results by round

Match results
The league announced home openers for every club on December 14, 2018. Legion FC were initially set to play the inaugural match in club history on March 9, facing Bethlehem Steel FC at BBVA Field; the game would later be postponed to March 10 due to inclement weather.

The full Birmingham schedule was released on December 19. Legion FC's inaugural season will consist of 34 matches, with home and away games against every Eastern Conference opponent. The club will be one of six new teams in the Eastern Conference: Hartford Athletic, Loudoun United, and Memphis 901 are also joining as expansion clubs, while Saint Louis FC and Swope Park Rangers move over from the Western Conference.

USL Cup Playoffs

U.S. Open Cup

As a member of the USL Championship, Birmingham Legion will enter the tournament in the Second Round, to be played May 15, 2019.

Statistics

Appearances and goals

|-
|colspan=10 align=center|Players who left Birmingham during the season:

|}

Disciplinary record

Clean sheets

Transfers

In

Loan in

Out

Awards

Kits

See also
 Birmingham Legion FC
 2019 in American soccer
 2019 USL Championship season

References

Birmingham Legion FC
Birmingham Legion
Birmingham Legion
Birmingham Legion